Qeshm is an arrow-shaped Iranian island in the Strait of Hormuz, separated from the mainland by the Clarence Strait/Khuran in the Persian Gulf. It is the largest island in Iran, and the largest in the Persian Gulf.

Geography

Qeshm Island is located a few kilometers off the southern Iran (Persian Gulf), opposite the port cities of Bandar Abbas and Bandar Khamir. At its widest point near the center, the island spans . Similarly, at its narrowest point, the island spans .

The warmest months are June through August, and the coldest from October to January.

The island comprises 59 towns and villages and the population was 117,774 at the 2011 Census. The local population is involved in fishing, dhow construction, trade and services. An additional 30,000 are administrative or industrial workers or students.

Plans have also been made to build a bridge to connect Qeshm with the rest of Iran.

Qeshm Island has multiple attractions to attract more domestic and foreign tourists.

Namakdan Salt Cave
At 6.58km long, Namakdan Salt Cave is the longest known salt cave in the world. Both salt and sulphur were mined here traditionally ('namak' is a Farsi word for salt) and it now forms the key geosite within the Qeshm Island UNESCO Global Geopark. The cave is formed within a large salt diapir formed of a succession of strata which dates from the late Proterozoic. It is also a candidate site for inscription on the list of World Heritage Sites. The locality was included within a list of the 'First 100 IUGS Geological Heritage Sites' published in October 2022 on account of its significance to our understanding of tectonics and active geological processes.

History

The earliest evidence of human presence at Qeshm dates back to the Paleolithic Period. Paleolithic stone tools have been found at Bam-e Qeshm. Historical records concerning the Qeshm island date far back into the pre-Islamic era. Names such as Qeshm, Keshm, Kish and Tunb mark the lengthy stay of Ilamids in the area, several centuries BC. It is, apparently, the island called Alexandria or Aracia by Ptolemy (Book 6, Chap. IV), in the 2nd century CE and Alexandria by Ammianus Marcellinus (xxiii.6.42) in the 4th century. On account of its strategic geopolitical situation near the mouth of the Persian Gulf, it has been frequently attacked by invaders including Ilamids (Elamites), Umayyads, and Abbasids as well as the Portuguese and the English. Under Sassanian rule the island was called Abarkawan, and was part of the Ardashir-Khwarrah administrative division. According to historical records, Qeshm Island has been famous as a trade and navigation center. Its economy flourished during the Dailamite and Buyid eras, as trade vessels sailed between Qeshm Island and China, India, and Africa.

Explorer William Baffin was mortally wounded on Qeshm in 1622 during a battle against Portuguese forces who occupied the fort, known to the English as "Forte de Queixome".

In the early 1900s, the island's population was almost exclusively Sunni and Arab.

Qeshm is also a supposed site of the Garden of Eden according to Cassell's Bible.

Iran Air Flight 655
On 3 July 1988, a civilian Iran Air Airbus A300 (Iran Air Flight 655) was shot down by a United States Navy guided missile cruiser USS Vincennes just south of the island, killing all 290 people aboard. The wreckage crashed 2.5 kilometers off Qeshm's southern coast.

Economy
Fishing is a leading occupation practiced by the inhabitants of the island. On what little cultivated land there is, dates and melons are grown. Salt is mined on the southeastern coast. 
Qeshm is famous for its wide range of ecotourist attractions such as the Hara marine forests. According to environmentalists, about 1.5% of the world birds and 25% of Iran's native birds annually migrate to the forests, which are the first national geo park in Iran. An ancient Portuguese fort, historic mosques, the Seyyed Mozaffar and Bibi Maryam shrines, and various ponds and mangrove forests are among the tourism attractions in the island, which lays across the azure waters of the Persian Gulf. Several domes, salty caves, the preserved area in Shibderaz Village where Hawksbill turtles hatch, as well as numerous docks and wharfs are among the tourist potentials of the island. The Nazz Islands are located at the south wing of Qeshm Island. Oysters, corals, colorful fishes and sea birds in these islands attract many tourists.  It is possible to walk toward the island on soft and wet gravel through a gravel connection way between these islands and Qeshm at the time of the ebb.

In the 1st ten-year plan, in note 19, the law provided for the creation of free trade zones and three locations were identified as such in the year 1991. They were Kish Island, Qeshm Island and Chabahar. In the year 1369 in the Iranian Solar Hijri calendar, equivalent to 1991 in the Gregorian calendar, the island was transformed into a "Trade and Industrial Free Area" with the goal of creating the largest Free Area between Europe and the Far East. To that end, Qeshm Island was granted considerable leeway to set its own policies, independent of the central government, which had often been seen as an impediment to growth in many sectors of the economy. However, the Island retains the advantages associated with its connection to the mainland, including the rights to explore and develop oil and gas opportunities.

Qeshm Island underground military facility
On 20 January 2012, OSGEOINT established the completion of an underground military facility at Qeshm island which accordingly could house Iran's Ghadir-Nahang class submarines.

Economy, culture, and education
Qeshm Institute of Higher Education
Islamic Azad University of Medical Science Qeshm International Branch

Visas
Holders of normal passports travelling as tourists can enter Qeshm without a visa with maximum stay of 30 days (extendable), as of December 2017.

Admission is refused to holders of passports or travel documents containing an Israeli visa or stamp or any data showing that visitor has been to Israel or indication of any connection with the state of Israel during the last 12 months.

See also 

2005 Qeshm earthquake
Ardashir-Khwarrah
Bandar Lengeh
Hormozgan
Qeshm Air
Qeshm International Airport

References

Further reading
 Speak the Wind (Mack, 2021; photographs by Hoda Afshar; essay by Michael Taussig) This work documents the landscapes and people of the islands of Hormuz, Qeshm, and Hengam, in the Persian Gulf off the south coast of Iran. Afshar got to know some of the people there, travelling there frequently over the years, and they told her about the history of the place. She said that "their narrations led the project", and she explores "the idea of being possessed by history, and in this context, the history of slavery and cruelty”.

External links 

 About Qeshm Island (Qeshm Island Global Geopark)

 

Foreign trade of Iran
Special economic zones
Islands of Iran
Persian Gulf
Former Portuguese colonies
Qeshm County
Landforms of Hormozgan Province
First 100 IUGS Geological Heritage Sites
Arab settlements in Hormozgan Province